Chase Vaughn (born September 4, 1988  in Richmond, Virginia) is an American football linebacker for the Winnipeg Blue Bombers of the Canadian Football League (CFL). He played football at Smoky Hill High School in Aurora, Colorado and college football at Colorado State University-Pueblo in Pueblo, Colorado.

Vaughn has also been a member of the Colorado Ice in the Indoor Football League and the Las Vegas Locomotives of the United Football League. He currently holds the CSU-Pueblo record for sacks in a single game (4.5).

References

1988 births
Living people
American football linebackers
CSU Pueblo ThunderWolves football players
Las Vegas Locomotives players
Colorado Crush (IFL) players
Calgary Stampeders players
Spokane Shock players